Burak Çalık (born 5 February 1989) is a Turkish footballer who plays as a striker for Çorum FK.

Life and career
Çalık was born in Erzincan, the capital of Erzincan Province. He started his football career with the local club Erzincanspor in 2001. He competed in the youth leagues until 2006, when he was promoted to the senior team. He played a total of 20 matches in the TFF First League, netting seven goals. Altay signed the forward in 2008. He has since been capped by the Turkey national under-21 football team, chosen as the best player of the year in the TFF First League, and attracted interest from Süper Lig clubs. Çalık signed a one-year extension with Altay at the end of the 2009–10 season.

International career
Çalık was first called up to the Turkey national under-21 football team in the summer of 2009, and earned his first cap in a friendly against Azerbaijan. He has also been called up for the 2011 UEFA European Under-21 Football Championship qualifying matches, as well as Akdeniz Cup matches.

References

External links
 
 

1989 births
Living people
Turkish footballers
Turkey under-21 international footballers
24 Erzincanspor footballers
Altay S.K. footballers
Samsunspor footballers
Adanaspor footballers
Balıkesirspor footballers
Adana Demirspor footballers
Denizlispor footballers
Süper Lig players
TFF First League players
TFF Second League players
Association football forwards
People from Erzincan